Lafayette is the name of some places in the U.S. state of Wisconsin:
Lafayette County, Wisconsin
Lafayette, Chippewa County, Wisconsin, a town
Lafayette, Monroe County, Wisconsin, a town
Lafayette, Walworth County, Wisconsin, a town
Fayette, Wisconsin, a town in Lafayette County, Wisconsin
Fayette (community), Wisconsin, an unincorporated community